Worker and Kolkhoz Woman is a sculpture of two figures with a sickle and a hammer raised over their heads. The concept and compositional design belong to the architect Boris Iofan. It is 24.5 metres (78 feet) high, made from stainless steel by Vera Mukhina for the 1937 World's Fair in Paris, and subsequently moved to Moscow. The sculpture is an example of socialist realism in an Art Deco aesthetic. The worker holds aloft a hammer and the kolkhoz woman a sickle to form the hammer and sickle symbol.

History

The sculpture was originally created to crown the Soviet pavilion of the 1937 World's Fair.  The organisers had placed the Soviet and German pavilions facing each other across the main pedestrian boulevard at the Trocadéro on the north bank of the Seine.

Mukhina was inspired by her study of the classical Harmodius and Aristogeiton, the Winged Victory of Samothrace and La Marseillaise, François Rude's sculptural group for the Arc de Triomphe, to bring a monumental composition of socialist realist confidence to the heart of Paris. The symbolism of the two figures striding from West to East, as determined by the layout of the pavilion, was also not lost on the spectators.

Mukhina said that her sculpture was intended "to continue the idea inherent in the building, and this sculpture was to be an inseparable part of the whole structure", but after the fair, the Rabochiy i Kolkhoznitsa was relocated to Moscow where it was placed just outside the All-Russia Exhibition Centre.

In 1941, the sculpture earned Mukhina one of the initial batch of Stalin Prizes.

The sculpture was removed for restoration in autumn of 2003 in preparation for Expo 2010. The original plan was for it to return in 2005, but because the World's Fair was not awarded to Moscow but to Shanghai, the restoration process was hampered by financial problems and re-installation was delayed.

It finally returned to its place at VDNKh on 28 November 2009. The revealing of the restored monument was held on the evening of December 4, 2009, accompanied by fireworks. The restored statue uses a new pavilion as its pedestal, increasing its total height from 34.5 metres (the old pedestal was 10 metres tall) to 60 metres (the new pavilion is 34.5 metres tall plus the 24.5 metres of the statue itself).

Use in media
In Soviet cinema, the sculpture was chosen in 1947 to serve as the logo for the film studio Mosfilm. It can be seen in the opening credits of the film Red Heat, as well as many of the Russian films released by the Mosfilm studio itself.

A giant moving reproduction of the statue was featured in the opening ceremony of the 2014 Winter Olympics in Sochi, Russia, symbolizing post-World War II Soviet society, particularly in Moscow.

Gallery

See also

Socialist realism
List of tallest statues

References

Statues in Russia
Monuments and memorials in Moscow
Colossal statues in Russia
Outdoor sculptures in Russia
Steel sculptures in Russia
Socialist realism
1937 sculptures
Relocated buildings and structures
World's fair sculptures
Exposition Internationale des Arts et Techniques dans la Vie Moderne
Monuments and memorials built in the Soviet Union
Sculptures in the Soviet Union
Mosfilm
Exhibition of Achievements of National Economy
Sculptures of women in Russia
Sculptures of men in Russia
Art Deco sculptures and memorials
Stainless steel sculptures
Cultural heritage monuments of federal significance in Moscow
France–Soviet Union relations